Albemarle County, North Carolina was a county located in the Province of North Carolina. It contained what is now the northeastern portion of the U.S. state of North Carolina.

History
Albemarle County was named for George Monck, 1st Duke of Albemarle, one of the eight Lords Proprietors of the Province of Carolina, for whom the Albemarle Sound is also named.  It contained approximately 1,600 square miles of territory, though its boundaries were not precise.  Under the original divisions of the province, the county to the south of Albemarle was called Clarendon County and centered on the Cape Fear region, but was only briefly occupied in the 1660s. Bath County was organized in 1696 and lay more closely to the south.

By 1670, four precincts of Albemarle County had been formed:  Shaftesbury, Currituck, Pasquotank, and Berkeley.  In 1681, Berkeley was renamed Perquimans, and by 1685 Shaftesbury became Chowan.  By 1689 the county ceased to function as a governmental unit, replaced by the four "precincts" (which would later become counties themselves): Chowan County, Currituck County, Pasquotank County, and Perquimans County.

From the original four precincts, Bertie Precinct was formed from part of Chowan in 1722, consisting of all territory west of the Chowan River.  Tyrrell Precinct was created in 1729.  Local residents asked that the western part of Bertie be divided into a new precinct as early as 1732, which led to the creation of Edgecombe Precinct (dates of the formation of Edgecombe vary from 1732 to 1741).

Albemarle County was officially abolished as an entity in 1739, and all the "precincts" were designated as "counties".

See also

 List of former United States counties
 Albemarle Settlements

References

External links
Albemarle County, North Carolina at the USGenWeb Project

1664 establishments in the Thirteen Colonies
1739 disestablishments in North Carolina
States and territories disestablished in 1739
Former counties of North Carolina
Province of Carolina
George Monck, 1st Duke of Albemarle